Tyrus Turner Barber (July 9, 1893 – October 20, 1968), was an American professional baseball outfielder, who played in Major League Baseball (MLB) from - for the Washington Senators, Chicago Cubs, and Brooklyn Robins.

In 491 games over nine seasons, Barber posted a .289 batting average (442-for-1531) with 189 runs, 2 home runs and 185 RBIs. He finished his career with a .978 fielding percentage playing at all three outfield positions and first base.

External links

1893 births
1968 deaths
Major League Baseball outfielders
Baseball players from Tennessee
People from Carroll County, Tennessee
Washington Senators (1901–1960) players
Chicago Cubs players
Brooklyn Robins players
Winston-Salem Twins players
Baltimore Orioles (IL) players
Atlanta Crackers players
Little Rock Travelers players
Memphis Chickasaws players
Birmingham Barons players
Mobile Bears players
Nashville Vols players
Quincy Indians players